There are 1,600 Buddhist temples scattered throughout the prefecture of Kyoto.

Nara period in Kyoto (710-794) 

 Otagi Nenbutsuji Temple

Heian period in Kyoto (794-1229) 

 .
 . 
 .   — World Historical Heritage Site
 .
, destroyed in 1233 and never rebuilt.
 .
 .   — World Historical Heritage Site
 .
 .
.
.
.
{{Nihongo|Enshō-ji|円勝寺|Enshō-ji]'}}.
.
.
 .
 , also spelled Kwajū-ji.
 .
 .

 Hōjō in the Kamakura period in Kyoto (1221-1333) 

 .
 .
 , formerly .
 .
 .
 Ryūhon-ji.
 .
 Nishi Otani Betsuin.

 Ashikaga in the Muromachi period in Kyoto (1333-1582) 

 Tōjo-in. 
 Tōjo-ji.
 .
 .
 Honkoku-ji. 
 .

 Azuchi-Momoyama period in Kyoto (1582-1615) 

 Hompa Hongwan-ji.
 Ōtaniha Hongwan-ji.
 . 
 Mimizuka.
 Sambō-in.
 .
 .

 Edo period in Kyoto (1615-1869) 

 Shōgo-in ( (聖護院)
 Chishaku-in.
 Reikan-ji.
 Reigen-ji.
 Yentsū-ji.
 Rinkyū-ji.

See also
 List of Shinto shrines in Kyoto
Thirteen Buddhist Sites of Kyoto

Notes

References
 Moscher, Gouvernor. (1978).  Kyoto: A Contemplative Guide. Tokyo: Tuttle Publishing.  
 Ponsonby-Fane, Richard Arthur Brabazon. (1956).  Kyoto: The Old Capital of Japan, 794-1869. Kyoto: The Ponsonby Memorial Society.  OCLC 36644
 Iwao, Seiichi, Teizō Iyanaga, Susumu Ishii, Shōichirō Yoshida, et al.'' (2002).  Dictionnaire historique du Japon. Paris: Maisonneuve & Larose. ;  OCLC 51096469
 Richie, Donald. (1995).  The Temples of Kyoto. Tokyo: Tuttle Publishing.

External links
 Kyoto Temples Alphabetical listing for Kyoto Prefecture (127 as of 8 December 2012)
 Photos of temples, shrines and gardens in Kyoto Alphabetical listing of attractions, but includes at least 114 Temples in Kyoto Prefecture (as of 8 December 2012)

 
Buddhist pilgrimage sites in Japan
Kyoto
Kyoto, Buddhist temples
Lists of religious buildings and structures in Japan